The 1070s was a decade of the Julian Calendar which began on January 1, 1070, and ended on December 31, 1079.

Significant people
 Omar Khayyam
 William the Conqueror
 Al-Qa'im
 Alp Arslan Seljuk sultan
 Malik-Shah I Seljuk sultan

References